Local elections were held in Cebu City on May 13, 2019 within the Philippine general election. Registered voters of the city elected candidates for the following elective local posts: mayor, vice mayor, district representative, and eight councilors at-large for each district. There are two legislative districts in the city.

On May 14, 2019, after more than 24 hours since the polls have closed, Edgardo Labella was proclaimed as Cebu City's new mayor. He led the mayoral race with 265,738 votes, followed by Osmeña with 246,813 votes.

Background

Tomas Osmeña of Bando Osmeña – Pundok Kauswagan (BOPK), who allied his group with Liberal Party, won the 2016 elections with 53.40% of the votes defeating then incumbent mayor Michael Rama of BARUG Team Rama, which was allied with United Nationalist Alliance. Meanwhile, Rama's running mate, incumbent vice mayor Edgardo Labella of BARUG Team Rama (BARUG), defeated Osmeña's running mate, then councilor Nestor Archival of BOPK, in the vice mayoralty election. Rama initially challenged the victory of Osmeña by holding a prayer rally with his supporters and threatened to file an electoral protest claiming that Osmeña committed electoral fraud.

On May 16, 2016, seven days after the 2016 elections, Rama conceded to Osmeña during the 3rd prayer rally in front of the Cebu City Hall. He reiterated however that he would pursue an electoral protest to question the results of the election.

On June 28, 2016, vice president-elect Leni Robredo administered the oath to Osmeña and six BOPK councilors who won in the 2016 elections at Cebu City Sports Center.

Despite winning as Mayor, Osmeña had to deal with a Cebu City Council that was dominated by councilors from Rama's party with eleven councilors including Cebu City Liga ng mga Barangay President Phillip Zafra who sits as an ex-officio member. During the inaugural session of the 14th Sangguniang Panlungsod, BARUG councilors prevented BOPK councilors from being able to get committee chairmanships and memberships. Instead, BOPK councilors were given with executive functions by Osmeña by designating them as deputy mayors in different fields. Osmeña defined the term "deputy mayor" as someone higher compared to holding a committee chairmanship or membership in the Cebu City Council which in turn made them as his alter egos.

The Cebu City Council experienced several shifts during the 14th Sangguniang Panlungsod which started when councilor Dave Tumulak left BARUG, where he ran and won during the 2016 elections, on August 24, 2016 to become an independent politician after a closed-door meeting with councilor Margot Osmeña, wife of mayor Osmeña. Tumulak cited the reason that he was tired of political quarrels in Cebu City and indicated his support on Osmeña's plans for Cebu City. Several days after, on August 30, 2016, councilor Nendell Hanz Abella also left BARUG to become an independent politician producing a city council with nine councilors from BARUG, six from BOPK and two from the independent bloc. On March 25, 2017, councilor Jerry Guardo, who was meted with a 3-month suspension by the DILG, left BARUG after he alleged that fellow party member Lemar Alcover, son of Councilor Pastor Alcover Jr., was behind the push for the implementation of his suspension. On the same day, Tumulak also confirmed that he was joining BOPK while Mayor Osmeña confirmed that Abella has joined them. This in turn gave the majority in the Cebu City Council to BOPK with nine councilors against BARUG's eight councilors.

BOPK's majority in the Cebu City Council was short-lived when Abella announced his resignation after he was appointed by president Rodrigo Duterte as commissioner in the 7th Division of the National Labor Relations Commission (NLRC) thus giving the two council blocs at an even 8–8 but still had vice mayor Edgardo Labella of BARUG to break the tie for party-line voting in the council. The names of Renato "Junjun" Osmeña Jr. and Inayawan barangay captain Lutherlee "Lotlot" Ignacio-Soon were recommended as replacements to Abella. Both Osmeña Jr. and Ignacio-Soon ran with BARUG but failed to make it to the Cebu City Council. Councilor Joel Garganera accused mayor Osmeña of maneuvering the appointment of their party ally as replacement of Abella in the Cebu City Council by claiming that BOPK reached out to Senator Manny Pacquiao to let former vice president Jejomar Binay, head of the United Nationalist Alliance (UNA), appoint instead Rengelle Pelayo to the council. Eventually, UNA endorsed Osmeña Jr. to fill the position vacated by Abella.

Councilor James Anthony Cuenco of BARUG was dismissed from public service on October 3, 2017 by the Office of the Ombudsman for alleged irregularities when he served as chief of staff of his father, former Cebu City South District representative Antonio Cuenco reducing BARUG's councilors to seven. Upon the appointment of Osmeña Jr. by Duterte, the council standing returned to 8-8. Erik Miguel Espina, son of former Cebu governor and senator Rene Espina, was nominated by BARUG to replace Cuenco. Espina's appointment gave BARUG the majority once again.

During the 2018 barangay and Sangguniang Kabataan elections, 49 out of the 80 elected barangay captains and 41 out of the 80 elected SK chairpersons in Cebu City were identified with BOPK. In the election for SK Federation president, BARUG fielded Sonia Cal of Barangay Tisa while BOPK fielded Jessica Resch of Barangay San Nicolas Proper. Resch won with 44 votes becoming the SK Federation president of Cebu City and ex-officio member of the Cebu City Council. Three barangay captains were initially floated as candidates for Liga ng mga Barangay (LNB) President namely Franklyn Ong of Barangay Kasambagan, Prisca Niña Mabatid of Barangay Mabolo and incumbent LNB President & councilor Phillip Zafra of Barangay Tisa. BOPK chose Ong as its candidate while Mabatid was chosen by BARUG after its candidate Zafra bowed out from the race. Despite the walkout of Mabatid's allies during the LNB elections, Ong still won with 51 votes. The election of Resch and Ong returned the majority of the Cebu City Council to BOPK with ten councilors.

In December 2018, BARUG was accredited as a political party by the Commission on Elections (COMELEC).

Councilor Espina announced on December 14, 2018 that he will only remain in his post until January 1, 2019 after the Court of Appeals reversed the ruling of the Office of the Ombudsman finding suspended councilor Cuenco guilty of serious dishonesty and grave misconduct and ordered his reinstatement to the Cebu City Council. Cuenco reported back to work as councilor on January 3, 2019.

BARUG had no mayoralty candidate for the 2019 elections as two of its leaders namely former mayor Rama and vice mayor Labella both expressed their intentions to run as mayor. On August 30, 2018, Rama announced his decision to run for vice mayor instead and gave way to Labella.

Osmeña named two of his allies, councilors Tumulak and Mary Ann de los Santos, as his possible candidate for vice mayor. There were also reports of BOPK-allied barangay captains pushing for an Osmeña-Ong tandem but Ong declined since he wanted to focus as LNB President. Osmeña officially declared de los Santos as his candidate for vice mayor during BOPK's rally at Lahug Elementary School gym. Osmeña also announced that BOPK was no longer affiliated with the Liberal Party (LP) as they have pledged allegiance to the Laban ng Demokratikong Pilipino (LDP) party of Senator Sonny Angara.

Debate
The Integrated Bar of the Philippines-Cebu City Chapter organized the only mayoral and vice mayoral debate for Cebu City originally scheduled on April 22, 2019 at Cebu City Sports Club. Osmeña, his running-mate de los Santos, and Labella confirmed their attendance. Rama was the only one who declined to participate and tried to convince Labella to join him in ditching the debate saying that it would only put Osmeña on the spotlight.

The IBP-Cebu City Chapter then moved the debate schedule to May 6, 2019 to give candidates quality time to observe the Holy Week. Upon Labella's request, the debate was once again postponed since he had to attend a meeting with Duterte in Malacañang. The IBP-Cebu City Chapter granted his request to move the schedule to May 10, 2019 which the other participants also agreed.

Mayoralty and vice mayoralty elections

Mayor

Tomas Osmeña ran for his second term as the mayor of Cebu City. Meanwhile, Edgardo Labella, who served as vice mayor of Cebu City under the administrations of Michael Rama and Osmeña, ran for his first time as mayor and defeated Osmeña.

Results by barangay

Vice Mayor
Mary Ann de los Santos, who was on her second term as Cebu City councilor for the North District and was eligible for a third and final term, opted to run for vice mayor. Michael Rama, who served 2 terms as mayor and 3 terms as vice mayor, ran again as vice mayor and defeated de los Santos.

District representatives

1st District
Raul del Mar ran for his third and final term, and won against actor Richard Yap.

2nd District
Rodrigo Abellanosa ran for his third and final term, and won against former Cebu City councilor for the South District Jocelyn Pesquera.

City Council
Incumbents are expressed in italics. Number indicates the ballot number assigned for the candidates by COMELEC.

By ticket

Laban ng Demokratikong Pilipino/Bando Osmeña – Pundok Kauswagan

Partido Demokratiko Pilipino-Lakas ng Bayan/Partido Barug

Partido Federal ng Pilipinas

Independents

By district

1st District
Note: Incumbent councilors Alvin Arcilla and Sisinio Andales were disqualified by COMELEC after it issued a writ of execution for the certificate of finality of the earlier decision canceling Arcilla's and Andales' certificate of candidacy (COC).
Key: Italicized: incumbent

 

| colspan="7" style="background:black;"|

2nd District
Key: Italicized: incumbent

| colspan="16" style="background:black;"|

Electoral dispute
In a five-page decision promulgated on June 28, 2019, the COMELEC First Division declared Sherwin Luie Abella a nuisance candidate after he failed to answer the petition for his disqualification filed by BOPK candidate for councilor Atty. Marie Velle "Amay" Abella, who received 110,131 votes in the 2019 elections. Both candidates share the same surname and ran for an elective post for councilor in Cebu City's 2nd (South) district. Amay was furnished a copy of the said order on July 2, 2019.

Amay hoped to get the 20,262 votes cast for Sherwin giving her 130,393 votes, which would dislodge newly-elected councilor Phillip Zafra who clinched the 8th slot in the Cebu City Council for south district. She only needs 5,162 votes to unseat Zafra. Should she succeed in unseating Zafra, this will raise the number of BOPK-allied councilors from six to seven.

On August 30, 2019, the COMELEC First Division ruled with finality that Sherwin has been disqualified for being a nuisance candidate. However, the election body ruled that not all of the votes garnered by Sherwin will go to the Amay. Upon the checking of ballots, if a voter voted for both candidates, this vote will not be credited to Amay. Only votes cast for Sherwin will automatically be credited to Amay according to the decision.

On May 26, 2020, Amay passed away due to illness according to Cebu City south district representative Rodrigo Abellanosa.

COMELEC went on with the recount of votes for Amay in September 2021 but was halted due to an appeal from Councilors Zafra and Renato Osmeña Jr.

References

2019 Philippine local elections
Elections in Cebu City
May 2019 events in the Philippines